Lesley Lloyd is a former English footballer who is best known for being the team captain for  Southampton Women's F.C. for the 1971 WFA Cup Final win.

Honors
 Southampton
 FA Women's Cup: 1970–71, 1971–72

References

Living people
Southampton Women's F.C. players
English women's footballers
Women's association footballers not categorized by position
Year of birth missing (living people)